Julie Yorn (born 1967) is an American film producer.

Biography
Yorn was born Julie Silverman and raised in a Jewish family, the daughter of Dr. Sydel Finfer Silverman Wolf and Mel Silverman. Her father was an artist and her mother was the president of the Wenner-Gren Foundation for Anthropological Research in New York. Her stepfather, Dr. Eric R. Wolf, is a distinguished professor emeritus of anthropology at Lehman College and the Graduate Center of the City University of New York. She graduated from Tulane University and then went on to work as a senior vice president at the Los Angeles-based, talent-management and film-production company Addis-Wechsler & Associates. In 2009, she quit the Firm to sign a first look deal with 20th Century Fox.

She is best known for producing the critically acclaimed film Hell or High Water (2016) that earned her an Academy Award for Best Picture nomination with Carla Hacken. She is president of production at Sidney Kimmel Entertainment.

Awards and nominations
 Nominated: Academy Award for Best Picture - Hell or High Water

Personal life
In 1996, she married attorney Kevin Yorn in a Jewish ceremony in Tarrytown, New York. They later divorced in 2005.

References

External links
 

1969 births
Living people
20th-century American Jews
American film producers
American people of Lithuanian-Jewish descent
21st-century American Jews